Kanopus-V-IK (formerly Kanopus-V 2) is a Russian Earth observation satellite developed by the All-Russian Scientific Research Institute of Electromechanics and operated by Roscosmos. It was launched on July 14, 2017, designed for monitoring the environment over a large swath of land, and has an expected service life of 5 years.

Design 
Kanopus-V-IK's mission is to collect data for environmental monitoring and mapping, detection of fires, agricultural planning, and assessing land use. It can also be used to monitor man-made and natural disasters. The satellite uses the Kanopus satellite bus. It was originally built as Kanopus-V 2 but was modified to include an infrared detection capability.

Kanopus-V-IK contains several instruments. The Multispectral Imaging System (MSS) covers four spectral bands. The green wavelengths are used for vegetation monitoring and the red to near-infrared wavelengths for fire and hotspot detection. The Multispectral Scanner Unit-IK-SR (MSU-IK-SRM) aids in fire detection over a  swath of the Earth's surface, while having a minimal revisit time due to the satellite's low orbit.

Launch 
Kanopus-V-IK launched from Baikonur Cosmodrome Site 31 on July 14, 2017, at 12:36 local time (06:36 UTC) on board a Soyuz 2 rocket. It was launched with over 70 other satellites in a satellite rideshare mission. It contained 48 CubeSats for Planet Labs.

References 

2017 in spaceflight
Spacecraft launched in 2017
Earth observation satellites
Earth observation satellites of Russia
Satellites of Russia
Satellites in low Earth orbit